"Big Chocolate" is a business term assigned to multi-national chocolate food producers, akin to the terms "Big Oil," "Big Pharma," and "Big Tobacco".

Definition 
According to self-described fair trade proponents including Ghanaian cooperative Kuapa Kokoo, "Big Chocolate" companies are Mondelez (which owns Cadbury), Mars, Nestlé, and The Hershey Company. Together these companies process about 12% of the world's 3 million tons of cocoa each year.

"Big Chocolate" also refers to the political and social effects of a unifying industry. Consolidated buying enables large cocoa users to wield significant impact in economies, many of them poor African nations, that rely on cocoa production as a critical element of foreign trade.

Miscellaneous 
At the core of the chocolate debate across Europe, parts of Asia and the United States is the definition of chocolate itself, and whether percentages of cocoa in production should render some candies unable to carry the chocolate food definition.

At issue also is the ability to replace cocoa butter or dairy components of chocolate with cheaper vegetable fats or polyglycerol polyricinoleate (PGPR), thereby reducing the quantity of actual cocoa in the finished product while creating a less healthy confection. Currently the United States, some parts of the European Union and Russia do not allow vegetable fats as ingredients of products labeled as chocolate. The United Kingdom, Ireland and Denmark allow vegetable fat as an ingredient.

There are many ethical issues implicated in the chocolate industry, among them child labor, environmental impact, sustainability, and the extreme poverty of the average cocoa farmer. Food Technology reports over two million children working on cocoa farms in Ghana and Cote d’Ivoire as a result of cocoa farmer poverty.

See also 
 Big business
 Child labor in cocoa production
 Cocoa production in Ivory Coast
 Fairtrade certification

References

Further reading 
  which cites Fair Trade Yearbook, 1994 and Cocoa Newsletter, No 3 for its information on Big Chocolate
 
 
  – MacDougall asks "is Big Chocolate to blame for the conditions of global chocolate production?"
 .
 The Emperors of Chocolate: Inside the Secret World of Hershey and Mars 

 

Anti-corporate activism
Chocolate industry
Libertarian terms